Deleted in lung and esophageal cancer 1 is a protein that in humans is encoded by the DLEC1 gene.

Function

The cytogenetic location of this gene is 3p21.3, and it is located in a region that is commonly deleted in a variety of malignancies. Down-regulation of this gene has been observed in several human cancers including lung, esophageal, renal tumors, and head and neck squamous cell carcinoma. In some cases, reduced expression of this gene in tumor cells is a result of aberrant promoter methylation. Several alternatively spliced transcripts have been observed that contain disrupted coding regions and likely encode nonfunctional proteins.[provided by RefSeq, Mar 2016].

References

Further reading